José Faustino Villamarín Menéndez (born February 19, 1950, in Asturias) is a former Spanish handball player who competed in the 1972 Summer Olympics. In 1972 he was part of the Spanish team which finished fifteenth in the Olympic tournament. He played all five matches and scored seven goals.

External links
Player profile at sports-reference.com

1950 births
Living people
People from Asturias
Spanish male handball players
Olympic handball players of Spain
Handball players at the 1972 Summer Olympics